The 1982–83 NBA season was the Washington Bullets' 22nd season in the NBA and their 10th season in the city of Washington, D.C.

Draft picks

Roster

Regular season

Season standings

z - clinched division title
y - clinched division title
x - clinched playoff spot

Record vs. opponents

Game log

Regular season

|- align="center" bgcolor="#ffcccc"
| 1
| October 29
| @ Indiana
| L 90–93
|
|
|
| Market Square Arena
| 0–1
|- align="center" bgcolor="#ccffcc"
| 2
| October 30
| @ Chicago
| W 143–125
|
|
|
| Chicago Stadium
| 1–1

|- align="center" bgcolor="#ffcccc"
| 3
| November 2
| @ Atlanta
| L 88–105
|
|
|
| The Omni
| 1–2
|- align="center" bgcolor="#ccffcc"
| 4
| November 3
| New Jersey
| W 104–85
|
|
|
| Capital Centre
| 2–2
|- align="center" bgcolor="#ffcccc"
| 5
| November 5
| @ Boston
| L 97–104
|
|
|
| Boston Garden
| 2–3
|- align="center" bgcolor="#ccffcc"
| 6
| November 6
| Indiana
| W 119–115 (OT)
|
|
|
| Capital Centre
| 3–3
|- align="center" bgcolor="#ffcccc"
| 7
| November 9
| Detroit
| L 105–108
|
|
|
| Capital Centre
| 3–4
|- align="center" bgcolor="#ffcccc"
| 8
| November 12
| New York
| L 87–88
|
|
|
| Capital Centre
| 3–5
|- align="center" bgcolor="#ffcccc"
| 9
| November 14
| @ Philadelphia
| L 92–101
|
|
|
| The Spectrum
| 3–6
|- align="center" bgcolor="#ffcccc"
| 10
| November 17
| San Antonio
| L 112–114
|
|
|
| Capital Centre
| 3–7
|- align="center" bgcolor="#ffcccc"
| 11
| November 19
| @ Los Angeles
| L 92–122
|
|
|
| The Forum
| 3–8
|- align="center" bgcolor="#ccffcc"
| 12
| November 20
| @ San Diego
| W 95–87
|
|
|
| San Diego Sports Arena
| 4–8
|- align="center" bgcolor="#ccffcc"
| 13
| November 24
| @ Phoenix
| W 106–93
|
|
|
| Arizona Veterans Memorial Coliseum
| 5–8
|- align="center" bgcolor="#ccffcc"
| 14
| November 26
| @ Indiana
| W 87–85
|
|
|
| Market Square Arena
| 6–8
|- align="center" bgcolor="#ccffcc"
| 15
| November 27
| Portland
| W 107–90
|
|
|
| Capital Centre
| 7–8

|- align="center" bgcolor="#ffcccc"
| 16
| December 1
| New Jersey
| L 99–105
|
|
|
| Capital Centre
| 7–9
|- align="center" bgcolor="#ccffcc"
| 17
| December 3
| New York
| W 105–98
|
|
|
| Capital Centre
| 8–9
|- align="center" bgcolor="#ccffcc"
| 18
| December 4
| @ Dallas
| W 115–105
|
|
|
| Reunion Arena
| 9–9
|- align="center" bgcolor="#ffcccc"
| 19
| December 8
| @ New Jersey
| L 95–98
|
|
|
| Brendan Byrne Arena
| 9–10
|- align="center" bgcolor="#ccffcc"
| 20
| December 9
| Denver
| W 98–90
|
|
|
| Capital Centre
| 10–10
|- align="center" bgcolor="#ffcccc"
| 21
| December 11
| @ New York
| L 79–85
|
|
|
| Madison Square Garden
| 10–11
|- align="center" bgcolor="#ccffcc"
| 22
| December 14
| @ Chicago
| W 108–102
|
|
|
| Chicago Stadium
| 11–1
|- align="center" bgcolor="#ccffcc"
| 23
| December 18
| @ Detroit
| W 119–110
|
|
|
| Pontiac Silverdome
| 12–11
|- align="center" bgcolor="#ccffcc"
| 24
| December 18
| Philadelphia
| W 100–97
|
|
|
| Capital Centre
| 13–11
|- align="center" bgcolor="#ccffcc"
| 25
| December 21
| Cleveland
| W 77–74
|
|
|
| Capital Centre
| 14–11
|- align="center" bgcolor="#ffcccc"
| 26
| December 23
| @ New Jersey
| L 90–97
|
|
|
| Brendan Byrne Arena
| 14–12
|- align="center" bgcolor="#ffcccc"
| 27
| December 25
| Atlanta
| L 91–97
|
|
|
| Capital Centre
| 14–13
|- align="center" bgcolor="#ccffcc"
| 28
| December 27
| Chicago
| W 89–87
|
|
|
| Capital Centre
| 15–13
|- align="center" bgcolor="#ccffcc"
| 29
| December 29
| Milwaukee
| W 94–87
|
|
|
| Capital Centre
| 16–13

|- align="center" bgcolor="#ffcccc"
| 30
| January 1
| @ New York
| L 77–98
|
|
|
| Madison Square Garden
| 16–14
|- align="center" bgcolor="#ccffcc"
| 31
| January 4
| Dallas
| W 92–84
|
|
|
| Capital Centre
| 17–14
|- align="center" bgcolor="#ffcccc"
| 32
| January 7
| Philadelphia
| L 89–106
|
|
|
| Capital Centre
| 17–15
|- align="center" bgcolor="#ffcccc"
| 33
| January 8
| @ Cleveland
| L 82–98
|
|
|
| Richfield Coliseum
| 17–16
|- align="center" bgcolor="#ffcccc"
| 34
| January 12
| @ Detroit
| L 100–116
|
|
|
| Pontiac Silverdome
| 17–17
|- align="center" bgcolor="#ffcccc"
| 35
| January 14
| Golden State
| L 104–116
|
|
|
| Capital Centre
| 17–18
|- align="center" bgcolor="#ffcccc"
| 36
| January 15
| @ San Antonio
| L 96–117
|
|
|
| HemisFair Arena
| 17–19
|- align="center" bgcolor="#ffcccc"
| 37
| January 18
| @ Houston
| L 98–100
|
|
|
| The Summit
| 17–20
|- align="center" bgcolor="#ffcccc"
| 38
| January 20
| Cleveland
| L 89–97
|
|
|
| Capital Centre
| 17–21
|- align="center" bgcolor="#ffcccc"
| 39
| January 21
| @ Milwaukee
| L 104–111
|
|
|
| MECCA Arena
| 17–22
|- align="center" bgcolor="#ffcccc"
| 40
| January 22
| Chicago
| L 86–95
|
|
|
| Capital Centre
| 17–23
|- align="center" bgcolor="#ccffcc"
| 41
| January 24
| Boston
| W 93–91
|
|
|
| Capital Centre
| 18–23
|- align="center" bgcolor="#ffcccc"
| 42
| January 26
| @ Boston
| L 99–125
|
|
|
| Boston Garden
| 18–24
|- align="center" bgcolor="#ccffcc"
| 43
| January 27
| Seattle
| W 99–86
|
|
|
| Capital Centre
| 19–24
|- align="center" bgcolor="#ccffcc"
| 44
| January 29
| Phoenix
| W 88–82
|
|
|
| Capital Centre
| 20–24

|- align="center" bgcolor="#ffcccc"
| 45
| February 2
| Kansas City
| L 115–117
|
|
|
| Capital Centre
| 20–25
|- align="center" bgcolor="#ccffcc"
| 46
| February 4
| San Diego
| W 100–93
|
|
|
| Capital Centre
| 21–25
|- align="center" bgcolor="#ccffcc"
| 47
| February 6
| Indiana
| W 103–99
|
|
|
| Capital Centre
| 22–25
|- align="center" bgcolor="#ccffcc"
| 48
| February 8
| Boston
| W 104–101 (OT)
|
|
|
| Capital Centre
| 23–25
|- align="center" bgcolor="#ccffcc"
| 49
| February 10
| Houston
| W 104–100
|
|
|
| Capital Centre
| 24–25
|- align="center" bgcolor="#ffcccc"
| 50
| February 15
| @ Golden State
| L 93–111
|
|
|
| Oakland–Alameda County Coliseum Arena
| 24–26
|- align="center" bgcolor="#ffcccc"
| 51
| February 18
| @ Seattle
| L 112–115
|
|
|
| Kingdome
| 24–27
|- align="center" bgcolor="#ffcccc"
| 52
| February 20
| @ Portland
| L 95–104
|
|
|
| Memorial Coliseum
| 24–28
|- align="center" bgcolor="#ccffcc"
| 53
| February 22
| @ Utah
| W 99–98
|
|
|
| Salt Palace Acord Arena
| 25–28
|- align="center" bgcolor="#ffcccc"
| 54
| February 23
| @ Kansas City
| L 107–113
|
|
|
| Kemper Arena
| 25–29
|- align="center" bgcolor="#ffcccc"
| 55
| February 26
| @ Denver
| L 111–125
|
|
|
| McNichols Sports Arena
| 25–30

|- align="center" bgcolor="#ffcccc"
| 56
| March 1
| Milwaukee
| L 99–101
|
|
|
| Capital Centre
| 25–31
|- align="center" bgcolor="#ffcccc"
| 57
| March 3
| @ Atlanta
| L 89–91
|
|
|
| The Omni
| 25–32
|- align="center" bgcolor="#ccffcc"
| 58
| March 4
| Los Angeles
| W 96–93
|
|
|
| Capital Centre
| 26–32
|- align="center" bgcolor="#ccffcc"
| 59
| March 6
| Atlanta
| W 102–91
|
|
|
| Capital Centre
| 27–32
|- align="center" bgcolor="#ccffcc"
| 60
| March 9
| Chicago
| W 110–92
|
|
|
| Capital Centre
| 28–32
|- align="center" bgcolor="#ffcccc"
| 61
| March 12
| Philadelphia
| L 86–95
|
|
|
| Capital Centre
| 28–33
|- align="center" bgcolor="#ffcccc"
| 62
| March 13
| @ Philadelphia
| L 93–97
|
|
|
| The Spectrum
| 28–34
|- align="center" bgcolor="#ccffcc"
| 63
| March 15
| Cleveland
| W 95–92 (OT)
|
|
|
| Capital Centre
| 29–34
|- align="center" bgcolor="#ffcccc"
| 64
| March 16
| @ Atlanta
| L 81–94 (OT)
|
|
|
| The Omni
| 29–35
|- align="center" bgcolor="#ffcccc"
| 65
| March 18
| New York
| L 100–106
|
|
|
| Capital Centre
| 29–36
|- align="center" bgcolor="#ccffcc"
| 66
| March 19
| @ New York
| W 96–90
|
|
|
| Madison Square Garden
| 30–36
|- align="center" bgcolor="#ccffcc"
| 67
| March 22
| Utah
| W 121–98
|
|
|
| Capital Centre
| 31–36
|- align="center" bgcolor="#ccffcc"
| 68
| March 24
| @ Chicago
| W 102–96
|
|
|
| Chicago Stadium
| 32–36
|- align="center" bgcolor="#ccffcc"
| 69
| March 25
| @ Milwaukee
| W 97–96
|
|
|
| MECCA Arena
| 33–36
|- align="center" bgcolor="#ccffcc"
| 70
| March 27
| Indiana
| W 120–101
|
|
|
| Capital Centre
| 34–36
|- align="center" bgcolor="#ccffcc"
| 71
| March 29
| Milwaukee
| W 94–81
|
|
|
| Capital Centre
| 35–36
|- align="center" bgcolor="#ccffcc"
| 72
| March 30
| @ New Jersey
| W 100–97
|
|
|
| Brendan Byrne Arena
| 36–36

|- align="center" bgcolor="#ccffcc"
| 73
| April 1
| @ Indiana
| W 123–109
|
|
|
| Market Square Arena
| 37–36
|- align="center" bgcolor="#ffcccc"
| 74
| April 2
| Boston
| L 117–120 (OT)
|
|
|
| Capital Centre
| 37–37
|- align="center" bgcolor="#ccffcc"
| 75
| April 5
| New Jersey
| W 95–89
|
|
|
| Capital Centre
| 38–37
|- align="center" bgcolor="#ffcccc"
| 76
| April 6
| @ Detroit
| L 96–107
|
|
|
| Pontiac Silverdome
| 38–38
|- align="center" bgcolor="#ccffcc"
| 77
| April 8
| @ Boston
| W 107–99
|
|
|
| Boston Garden
| 39–38
|- align="center" bgcolor="#ccffcc"
| 78
| April 9
| Atlanta
| W 100–78
|
|
|
| Capital Centre
| 40–38
|- align="center" bgcolor="#ccffcc"
| 79
| April 13
| @ Philadelphia
| W 95–76
|
|
|
| The Spectrum
| 41–38
|- align="center" bgcolor="#ffcccc"
| 80
| April 14
| @ Milwaukee
| L 90–97
|
|
|
| MECCA Arena
| 41–39
|- align="center" bgcolor="#ccffcc"
| 81
| April 16
| Detroit
| W 102–95
|
|
|
| Capital Centre
| 42–39
|- align="center" bgcolor="#ffcccc"
| 82
| April 17
| @ Cleveland
| L 105–118
|
|
|
| Richfield Coliseum
| 42–40

Player statistics

Season

Awards and records

Transactions

References

See also
 1982–83 NBA season

Washington Wizards seasons
W
Washing
Washing